Jane Lovering is a British writer of romance novels since 2008. In 2012, her novel Please Don't Stop the Music won the Romantic Novel of the Year Award by the Romantic Novelists' Association. In 2018, her book, Christmas at the Little Village School, won Love Story of the Year at the Romantic Novelists' Association awards.

Biography
Jane Lovering was born in Devon, England, UK, but now lives in Yorkshire with her five children. She works in a local school and also teaches creative writing.

Bibliography

Single novels
 Reversing Over Liberace (2008)
 Slightly Foxed (2009)
 Please Don't Stop the Music (2011)
 Star Struck (2011)
 Hubble Bubble (2013)
 How I Wonder What You Are (2014)
 Christmas at the Little Village School (2017)

Otherworlders
 Vampire State of Mind (2012)
 Falling Apart (2014)

References and sources

Year of birth missing (living people)
Writers from Devon
Living people
English romantic fiction writers
RoNA Award winners
21st-century British novelists
21st-century British women writers
Women romantic fiction writers
British women novelists